Caio de Souza Pacheco (born 22 February 1999) is a Brasilian basketball player for the Capitanes de Ciudad de México of the NBA G League.

Professional career 

Recruited by former player Pepe Sánchez, the first Argentine player to play in the NBA and well known in the ACB league, Pacheco signed with Argentinian team Bahía Basket.

In the 2018–19 season he played 19 games in which he averaged 5.63 points per game. In the following season he played 21 games in which he averaged 19.43 points.

In the 2020–21 season, he would play 30 games in which he averaged more than 16 points, 5 rebounds and 5 assists per game.

On March 2, 2021, he signed a one-month temporary contract with UCAM Murcia of the Endesa League, on loan from Bahía Basket of the Argentine National Basketball League to replace Isaiah Taylor's injury. After playing only three games with the Murcian team, Pacheco returned to Bahía Basket.

On July 19, 2021, he signed for Victoria Libertas Pesaro of Lega Basket Serie A.

On November 11, 2021, he signed for MKS Dąbrowa Górnicza of the Polska Liga Koszykówki.

NBA G League (2022–present) 

For the 2022–23 season, Pacheco signed with the Capitanes de Ciudad de México of the NBA G League.

References

1999 births
Living people